Bossiney (meaning Cyni's dwelling) is a village in north Cornwall, England, United Kingdom. It is north-east of the larger village of Tintagel which it adjoins: further north-east are the Rocky Valley and Trethevy. Until 1832 the village, with its neighbour Tintagel, returned two MPs as a Rotten Borough, for the Bossiney constituency. The beach of Bossiney Haven is located nearby.

Toponymy
Bossiney, which in Domesday Book was 'Botcinnii', has been explained in Cornish as: 'Bod-' ('dwelling') and 'Cini' (a man's name). The spelling varied in the past (Bossinney was at one time very common). Novelist John Galsworthy used 'Bosinney' as the surname of a character in the Forsyte Saga.

History

Bossiney was mentioned in Domesday Book as 'Botcinnii', a manor held by the Count of Mortain from St. Petroc's Church (i.e. Bodmin Monastery), the manor at this time including Trevena. From ca. 1552, two members were elected to the unreformed House of Commons by the burgesses of Bossiney and Trevena, until the Reform Act 1832 stripped it of its representation as a rotten borough. Bossiney was the Parliamentary seat of Francis Drake who in 1584 gave his election speech from Bossiney Mound. It was also the Parliamentary seat in 1584 of Sir Francis Bacon. 

The mace and seal of the borough are still preserved and show the name of the borough as 'Tintaioel' (they are thought to be from the 16th century). Despite electing two MPs, the Borough of Bossiney in the 18th century was described as a very small place with scarcely twenty houses and those no better than cottages!

Places of interest

Bossiney lies within the Cornwall Area of Outstanding Natural Beauty (AONB). A nearby beach is known as Bossiney Haven.

Notable buildings include the Old Borough House, Bossiney Court (both houses are 17th century and later) and the Methodist chapel (1860). All these are listed Grade II. At the nearby crossroads stands Hendra Cross or Pentaly Cross (towards Trevillet): it has been moved from its former position due to road widening in 1959  ("about one and half miles north east of Bossiney, at Pentaly").

Willapark on the coast nearby was an Iron Age cliff castle and at Lye Rock the barque 'Iota' was wrecked in 1893 (see the Tintagel article). Willapark Manor stands in wooded grounds and is now an hotel; Jill Pool is the site of the former borough gaol.

To the east of Bossiney lie the remains of an earthen ringwork and bailey, which were discovered during archaeological excavations during the 1840s. The castle is not mentioned in surviving contemporary documents, and it is uncertain when or by whom it was built. However, it was probably built in the late 11th or 12th century.

See also

 Bossiney (UK Parliament constituency)
 Lye Cove

References

Bibliography
 Rose, Peter (1992) "Bossiney Castle", Cornish Archaeology 31 pp. 138–142.
 Williams, Michael (ca. 1970) Bossiney. ([9] pp., illus.) [Tintagel: the author]

External links 
 

Manors in Cornwall
Tintagel
Villages in Cornwall